Thomas Andrew (by 1458 – 1517), of Exeter, Devon, was an English politician.

He was a Member (MP) of the Parliament of England for Exeter in 1510. He was Mayor of Exeter in 1513–14.

References

15th-century births
1517 deaths
Members of the Parliament of England (pre-1707) for Exeter
English MPs 1510
Mayors of Exeter